On May 12, 2007, Alec Kreider, a 16-year-old high school student at the time, murdered his classmate and friend Kevin Haines, his father Thomas Haines, and mother Lisa Haines in their home in Manheim Township, Pennsylvania. Kreider was arrested a month later on June 16, 2007 and was charged with three counts of first degree murder. He pleaded guilty to all charges, and was subsequently convicted on all three counts and sentenced to three consecutive life sentences without the possibility of parole. Kreider later became eligible for a re-sentencing hearing following the United States Supreme Court's 2012 decision in Miller v. Alabama, which held that mandatory sentences of life without the possibility of parole are unconstitutional for juvenile offenders.

On January 20, 2017, Kreider died by suicide by hanging himself in his prison cell, before the resentencing hearing was scheduled.

Background

Alec Kreider 
Alec Devon Kreider was born on February 4, 1991, to Timothy Scot Kreider and Angela Parsons Kreider. Kreider lived with his mother and was a sophomore student at Manheim Township High School. He suffered from severe anger issues and tried to strangle his brother when he was younger.

Haines family 
Thomas Alan Haines (age 50), an industrial-supplies salesman who worked in Lancaster, Lisa Ann Haines (née Brown, age 47), a preschool teacher at Lancaster Brethren Preschool, their daughter Maggie (age 20), a student at Bucknell University, and their son Kevin (age 16), a high school sophomore, lived in Manheim Township, Lancaster County, Pennsylvania. Kevin Haines was also a sophomore student at Manheim Township High School, where he was classmates with Kreider in German class, and according to a fellow student the two were "close buddies". Alec attended the family's memorial service on May 19, 2007.

Murders, police response, and investigation 

On morning of May 12, 2007, Maggie Haines, who was awakened by a noise in the middle of the night and "smelled blood", ran from the home and across the street to a neighbor who called 911 for help.

Alec Kreider (then age 16) had entered the Haines' home without force, stabbing Thomas and Lisa  in their sleep, killing Thomas and severely wounding Lisa. Alec then went to Kevin's room and, after a struggle, stabbed him to death before returning to slit Lisa's throat, killing her, then escaping before the police could arrive. Communication between the Haines' neighbor, the call-taker at 911, and the dispatcher caused extreme unnecessary delay in police response to the "unknown disturbance". The official timeline notes that it took the first responding officer nearly twelve minutes to arrive from a distance of four miles in the middle of the night with no traffic barriers. Police say this delay had no bearing on the survival of the victims. The parents were found dead in their bedroom and Kevin was found at the opposite end of the upstairs hallway on the floor outside his bedroom. According to police reports, bloody shoe prints led away from Kevin's body and into the parents' bedroom, and from there to the common upstairs bathroom, where a shoe print was found on the linoleum in front of the sink. Police presume the murderer attempted to clean up at the sink as blood was also found there. Bloody shoe prints appeared on lower carpeted steps as the perpetrator exited the house. Blood transfer was also found on the rear sliding glass door. Maggie Haines was not killed because Alec did not know that she was home from college at the time of the murders.

The law enforcement investigation began around 2:40 a.m. on May 12, 2007. The victims were declared dead shortly after 5 a.m. by deputy county coroners, and autopsies were performed two days later. The day after the murders, bloodhounds tracked "a strong scent of fear" along a path that led down the hill to PA Route 501 and north to an ice cream/fast food restaurant, where the trail vanished. Police presumed the perpetrator had a vehicle waiting and used it to escape. Upon Kreider's arrest, all information associated with the bloodhounds was dismissed, as it did not match law enforcement's new theory. The police explanation was that "the dogs made a mistake".

Arrest, trial, and aftermath 
After a month of intense national and regional media coverage and speculation, including tracking by bloodhounds and an intensive search by Pennsylvania State Police cadets, Kreider was arrested on June 16, 2007. Kreider's father, Timothy Scot Kreider, informed authorities that his son had confessed to the killings two days earlier. Kreider pled guilty to three counts of first degree murder and was sentenced to three consecutive life sentences without parole on June 17, 2008. His age at the time of the crime prevented him from being sentenced to death due to a U.S. Supreme Court ruling, Roper v. Simmons (2005). Pennsylvania Court of Common Pleas Judge David Ashworth denied Kreider's post-sentence challenge to his consecutive sentences, and the Pennsylvania Superior Court affirmed Ashworth's denial. On December 8, 2009, Kreider filed a petition under Pennsylvania's Post-Conviction Collateral Relief Act, which Judge Ashworth denied on June 15, 2010. An appeal to Pennsylvania Superior Court was later discontinued by Kreider.

Kreider's motive for the killings was unclear, although according to an entry investigators found in his journal, he claims to have "despised happy people". A financial reward offered on behalf of the Haines family remained unclaimed.

Death 
On January 20, 2017 (15 days shy of his 26th birthday), Kreider died by suicide in his prison cell at SCI Camp Hill in Cumberland County, Pennsylvania.

At the time of his death, Kreider was among a group of Lancaster County juvenile offenders eligible for a resentencing hearing in view of the United States Supreme Court's 2012 decision in Miller v. Alabama that mandatory sentences of life in prison without the possibility of parole are unconstitutional for juvenile offenders, and the 2016 decision in Montgomery v. Louisiana that made Miller apply retroactively. The county had delayed scheduling these hearings, pending a Pennsylvania Supreme Court ruling in Commonwealth v. Batts.

In media 
The murder of the Haines family was the subject of the Season 3 premiere of Investigation Discovery's Unusual Suspects; the network revisited the case in a 2014 episode of its Nightmare Next Door series; and again in 2019 in an episode of its Evil Lives Here series.  Author Michael W. Cuneo also wrote about the case in his true crime book A Need to Kill: Confessions of a Teen Killer. Alec Kreider's father, Tim Kreider, also wrote a book, Refuse to Drown, concerning his son's involvement in the killings and the emotional turmoil the Kreider family went through in the aftermath. The story was also covered in the A&E series Killer Kids in 2014.

References

Further reading 
  Kreider, Tim.  Refuse to Drown.

External links 
 Affidavit for Kreider's arrest

1991 births
2017 suicides
American people convicted of murder
2007 murders in the United States
Murder committed by minors
People convicted of murder by Pennsylvania
Place of birth missing
Prisoners sentenced to life imprisonment by Pennsylvania
American prisoners sentenced to life imprisonment
Family murders
Prisoners who died in Pennsylvania detention
Murderers who committed suicide in prison custody
American people who died in prison custody
Suicides by hanging in Pennsylvania